The Beaumont Reserve Fleet, was established by act of Congress in 1946, as a component of the National Defense Reserve Fleet (NDRF). The fleet is located in Beaumont, Texas.

History
In 1946, the US Government excavated 24 million cubic yards of soil from the Neches River, southeast of Beaumont, to create the McFadden Bend Cutoff. This is the location of the fleet. The Neches River connects to Sabine Lake and then the Gulf of Mexico.

The Beaumont Reserve Fleet is one of only three remaining National Defense Reserve Fleets, of the original eight NDRFs, and the only anchorage on the Gulf Coast. The fleet is maintained by the Maritime Administration (MARAD), an agency of the Department of Transportation (DOT).

, there were 22 ships in the Beaumont Reserve Fleet. The other Reserve Fleets are the Suisun Bay Reserve Fleet inland from San Francisco Bay and the James River Reserve Fleet in Virginia.

Inventory
:

See also
Atlantic Reserve Fleet, Orange
Ready Reserve Force
Project Liberty Ship
Naval Inactive Ship Maintenance Facility

References

 
Military in Texas
National Defense Reserve Fleet
United States Navy Reserve
1946 establishments in Texas